Sh is a digraph of the Latin alphabet, a combination of S and H.

European languages

Albanian
In Albanian, sh represents . It is considered a distinct letter, named shë, and placed between S and T in the Albanian alphabet.

Breton
In Breton, sh represents . It is not considered a distinct letter and it is a variety of zh (e. g.  ("older"). It is not considered as a diphthong in compound words, such as kroashent ("roundabout": kroaz ("cross") + hent ("way", "ford").

English
In English,  usually represents . Sh is not considered a distinct letter for collation purposes.

 American Literary braille includes a single-cell contraction for the digraph with the dot pattern (1 4 6). In isolation it stands for the word "shall".

In Old English orthography, the sound  was written .

Irish

Ladino
In Judaeo-Spanish, sh represents  and occurs in both native words (‘under’) and foreign ones (shalom, ‘hullo’). In the Hebrew script it is written ש.

Occitan
In Occitan, sh represents . It mostly occurs in the Gascon dialect of Occitan and corresponds with s or ss in other Occitan dialects: peish = peis "fish", naishença = naissença "birth", sheis = sièis "six". An i before sh is silent: peish, naishença are pronounced . Some words have sh in all Occitan dialects: they are Gascon words adopted in all the Occitan language (Aush "Auch", Arcaishon "Arcachon") or foreign borrowings (shampó "shampoo").

For s·h, see Interpunct#Occitan.

Spanish 
In Spanish, sh represents  almost only in foreign origin words, as flash, show, shuara or geisha. Royal Spanish Academy recommends adapting in both spelling and pronunciation with s, adapting to common pronunciation in peninsular dialect. Nevertheless, in American dialects it is frequently pronounced [t͡ʃ].

Other languages

Somali 
Sh represents the sound  in the Somali Latin Alphabet. It is considered a separate letter, and is the 9th letter of the alphabet.

Uyghur
Sh represents the sound  in the Uyghur Latin script. It is considered a separate letter, and is the 14th letter of the alphabet.

Uzbek
In Uzbek, the letter sh represents . It is the 27th letter of the Uzbek alphabet.

Romanization
In the Pinyin, Wade-Giles, and Yale romanizations of Chinese, sh represents retroflex .

In the Hepburn romanization of Japanese, sh represents . Other romanizations write  as s before i and sy before other vowels.

International auxiliary languages

Ido
In Ido, sh represents .

References

Latin-script digraphs